Coronavir is an anti-viral drug approved in Russia for the treatment of COVID-19. Little is known of this drug, except for the information released by its developer R-Pharm.

By the description provided to the press, coronavir seems to be an inhibitor of SARS-CoV-2 RNA polymerase, similar to other antiviral nucleotide analogues such as remdesivir. The drug appears to be based on favipiravir, a drug developed in Japan.

Coronavir was approved for use in Russia in hospitals in July 2020, and in September 2020 it received approval for prescription sales for outpatient use.

See also
 COVID-19 pandemic in Russia

References

COVID-19 pandemic in Russia
Antiviral drugs
Drugs with undisclosed chemical structures